Season two of the 2011 edition of El gran show premiered on August 6, 2011.

In this season the score "11" was added, which symbolizes the perfection of the performance. It was enabled from the fourth week, being Anahí de Cárdenas and John Cáceres the first couple to obtain it.

On October 29, 2011, Jesús Neyra and Lucero Clavijo were crowned champions, Belén Estévez and Waldir Felipa finished second, while Maricielo Effio and Elí Vela  finished third.

Cast

Couples
On July 30, 2015, the heroes and dreamers were released in a special episode. For this season, several former participants returned, including Belén Estévez, Jesús Neyra, Maricielo Effio, Anahí de Cárdenas y Marisol Aguirre. Denny Valdeiglesias became the first participant to belong to the production of the show. Due to what happened last season with the six dreamers eliminated, only returned Carmen Varillas, Gloria Cerdán and Jhon Cáceres.

During week 7, Maricielo Effio suffered an injury while dancing in the versus, in addition to having a sprain of second degree, reason why was replaced by the actress and singer Tati Alcántara in weeks 8 and 9.

Host and judges
Gisela Valcárcel, Aldo Díaz and Cristian Rivero returned as hosts, while Morella Petrozzi, Carlos Alcántara, Pachi Valle Riestra and the VIP Jury returned as judges. In week 10, the singer and choreographer Abel Talamántez replaced Alcántara.

Scoring charts

Red numbers indicate the sentenced for each week
Green numbers indicate the best steps for each week
 the couple was eliminated that week
 the couple was safe in the duel
 the couple was eliminated that week and safe with a lifeguard
 the winning couple
 the runner-up couple
 the third-place couple

Average score chart
This table only counts dances scored on a 40-point scale.

Highest and lowest scoring performances
The best and worst performances in each dance according to the judges' 40-point scale are as follows:

Couples' highest and lowest scoring dances
Scores are based upon a potential 40-point maximum.

Weekly scores 
Individual judges' scores in the charts below (given in parentheses) are listed in this order from left to right: Morella Petrozzi, Carlos Alcántara, Pachi Valle Riestra, VIP Jury.

Week 1: Latin Pop
The couples danced latin pop. 
Running order

Week 2: Salsa
The couples (except those sentenced) danced salsa.
Running order

*The duel
Renato & Gloria: Safe
Maribel & Juan Manuel: Eliminated
Denny & Tiffany: Safe

Week 3: Disco
The couples danced disco (except those sentenced) and a danceathon of salsa.
Running order

*The duel
Jean Paul & Carmen: Eliminated (but safe with the lifeguard)
Chatín & Roxana: Safe

Week 4: Reggaeton
The couples danced reggaetón (except those sentenced) and a team dance of Bollywood.
Running order

*The duel
Renato & Gloria: Safe
Chatín & Roxana: Eliminated

Week 5: Cumbia
The couples danced cumbia (except those sentenced) and a team dance of hula.
Running order

*The duel
Renato & Gloria: Eliminated (but safe with the lifeguard)
Marrón & Tiffany: Safe
Erika & André: Safe

Week 6: Merengue
The couples (except those sentenced) danced merengue. In the versus, the couples faced dancing jazz.
Running order

*The duel
Ariel & Grecia: Safe
Renato & Gloria: Eliminated
Erika & André: Safe

Week 7: Tex-Mex
The couples (except those sentenced) danced tex-mex. In the versus, the couples faced dancing jazz.

Maricielo Effio suffered an injury when he made her performance in the versus, so Marisol Aguirre and Jorge Ávila won the 2 extra points.
Running order

*The duel
Ariel & Grecia: Safe
Erika & André: Safe
Denny & Tiffany: Eliminated

Week 8: Trio Salsa
The couples (except those sentenced) danced trio salsa involving a member of the troupe. In the versus, the couples faced dancing the world dances.

Due to the injury that Maricielo Effio suffered last week, Tati Alcántara danced instead.
Running order

*The duel
Ariel & Grecia: Safe
Tati & Elí: Eliminated (but safe with the lifeguard)

Week 9: Merengue House
The couples (except those sentenced) danced merengue house. In the versus, the couples faced dancing one unlearned ballroom dance.
Running order

*The duel
Ariel & Grecia: Safe
Anahí & John: Eliminated

Week 10: Latin Pop/Adagio Under the Rain
Individual judges' scores in the chart below (given in parentheses) are listed in this order from left to right: Morella Petrozzi, Abel Talamántez, Pachi Valle Riestra, VIP Jury.

The couples danced Latin pop (except those sentenced) and adagio under the rain. Maricielo Effio returned to the competition after being absent for two weeks.
Running order

*The duel
Erika & André: Eliminated
Ariel & Grecia: Safe

Week 11: Quarterfinals 
Individual judges' scores in the charts below (given in parentheses) are listed in this order from left to right: Morella Petrozzi, Carlos Alcántara, Pachi Valle Riestra, VIP Jury.

The couples danced cumbia (except those sentenced), axé under the rain and a team dance of jazz.
Running order

*The duel
Ariel & Grecia: Eliminated
Jean Paul & Carmen: Safe

Week 12: Semifinals
The couples danced guaracha (except those sentenced) and cha-cha-cha or paso doble. In the train, the participants faced dancing jazz.
Running order

*The duel
Marisol & Jorge: Eliminated
Jean Paul & Carmen: Safe

Week 13: Finals
On the first part, the couples saved danced a mix (festejo/merengue/quebradita) while the couples sentenced danced marinera. Then all the couples danced a freestyle.

On the second part, the final three couples danced salsa and quickstep.
Running order (Part 1)

Running order (Part 2)

Dance chart
The celebrities and their dreamers will dance one of these routines for each corresponding week:
 Week 1: Latin pop (Latin Pop)
 Week 2: Salsa (Salsa)
 Week 3: Disco & the danceathon (Disco)
 Week 4: Reggaeton & team dances (Reggaeton)
 Week 5: Cumbia & team dances (Cumbia)
 Week 6: Merengue & the versus (Merengue)
 Week 7: Tex-mex & the versus (Tex-Mex)
 Week 8: Trio salsa & the versus (Trio Salsa)
 Week 9: Merengue house & the versus (Merengue House)
 Week 10: Latin pop & adagio (Latin Pop/Adagio Under the Rain)
 Week 11: Cumbia, axé & team dances (Quarterfinals)
 Week 12: Guaracha, cha-cha-cha or paso doble & the train (Semifinals)
 Week 13: Mix (festejo/merengue/quebradita), freestyle, salsa & quickstep (Finals)

 Highest scoring dance
 Lowest scoring dance
 Gained bonus points for winning this dance
 Gained no bonus points for losing this dance
In italic indicate the dances performed in the duel

References

External links

El Gran Show
2011 Peruvian television seasons
Reality television articles with incorrect naming style